B. spicata may refer to:

 Banksia spicata, a synonym for Banksia integrifolia subsp. integrifolia, a flowering plant species
 Byrsonima spicata, the Maricao tree, a plant species in the genus Byrsonima

See also
 Spicata (disambiguation)